Snake Rhythm Rock is the seventh album by guitarist Ivan "Boogaloo Joe" Jones which was recorded in 1972 and released on the Prestige label.

Track listing 
All compositions by Ivan "Boogaloo Joe" Jones except where noted
 "Hoochie Coo Chickie" - 5:26   
 "Snake Rhythm Rock" - 5:34   
 "The First Time Ever I Saw Your Face" (Ewan MacColl) - 5:55   
 "He's So Fine" (Ronald Mack) - 6:33   
 "Big Bad Midnight Roller" - 9:00

Personnel 
Ivan "Boogaloo Joe" Jones - guitar
Rusty Bryant - alto saxophone, tenor saxophone
Butch Cornell - organ
Jimmy Lewis - electric bass
Grady Tate - drums

References 

Boogaloo Joe Jones albums
1973 albums
Prestige Records albums
Albums recorded at Van Gelder Studio
Albums produced by Ozzie Cadena